Willis Pele "The Hitman" Meehan (born 11 September 1995) is an Australian professional boxer. He previously played professional rugby league for the Sydney Roosters in the National Rugby League. He has been compared to good friend and another rugby league-boxer and former teammate Sonny Bill Williams.

Background
Born in Auckland, New Zealand, Meehan moved to New South Wales, Australia, at a young age and played his junior football for the West Ryde Aliens and Wyong Roos before being signed by the Sydney Roosters.

Playing career
In 2013 and 2014, Meehan played for the Sydney Roosters' NYC team. In 2013, he played for the Australian Schoolboys. In Round 14 of the 2014 NRL season, Meehan made his NRL debut for the Roosters against the Newcastle Knights. In 2015, Meehan was stood down by the Roosters after being charged with robbery in company and assault occasioning actual bodily harm. He was sacked by the club in July 2015.

Boxing
As a 17-year-old, Meehan won the Australian super-heavyweight boxing title and hoped to fight at the Commonwealth Games, narrowly missing out. In 2016, he hopes to fight at the 2016 Summer Olympics.

On 31 January 2015, Meehan fought on the undercard of the Sonny Bill Williams v Chauncy Welliver bout.

On 15 November 2015, Meehan defeated Leamy Tato; however, the main event saw Meehan's father defeated by Joseph Parker.

Professional boxing record

Personal life
Meehan is the son of professional boxer, Kali Meehan. He converted to Islam in 2015.

In April 2015, Meehan was charged with headbutting a man and stealing his watch near The Star, Sydney. However, he was not convicted after his robbery in company charge was thrown out. Meehan later revealed he had been working, while playing for the Roosters, as a stand-over man to settle debts for hardened criminals.

References

External links
 Sydney Roosters profile
 

1995 births
Living people
Australian people of I-Taukei Fijian descent
Australian rugby league players
Australian male boxers
Converts to Islam
Heavyweight boxers
Junior Kangaroos players
New Zealand emigrants to Australia
Rugby league second-rows
Rugby league props
Rugby league locks
Rugby league players from Auckland
Sydney Roosters players
Wyong Roos players